Dunn is an extinct town in Hickory Grove Township, Benton County, in the U.S. state of Indiana.

Named for Capt. James Dunn, it stands about one and a half miles east of Dunnington.  In the 1920s it had two general stores, a grain elevator and about half a dozen residences. The post office at Dunn was established in 1907 and discontinued in 1913.

Geography
Dunn is located at  along Benton County Road 300 South, on the border of Parish Grove Township and Hickory Grove Township.  A defunct and overgrown rail line runs north and south through the settlement.

References

External links

Former populated places in Benton County, Indiana
Former populated places in Indiana